Marlene Bruten (born 18 June 1969) is a Mexican swimmer. She competed in four events at the 1988 Summer Olympics.

She won a silver medal in the 200 m butterfly at the 1989 Maccabiah Games, in Israel.

References

1969 births
Living people
Mexican female swimmers
Olympic swimmers of Mexico
Swimmers at the 1988 Summer Olympics
Pan American Games competitors for Mexico
Swimmers at the 1987 Pan American Games
Competitors at the 1969 Maccabiah Games
Maccabiah Games silver medalists
Maccabiah Games medalists in swimming
Place of birth missing (living people)
21st-century Mexican women
20th-century Mexican women